Walter A. Wohlgemuth (born 15 May 1966 in Bad Kreuznach) is  a German radiologist and neuroradiologist and Director of the University Clinic and Policlinic of Radiology at the Martin-Luther-Universität Halle-Wittenberg.

Biography 
Wohlgemuth studied medicine at the University of Regensburg, at the Technische Universität München and at the Ludwig Maximilian University of Munich as well as health economics at the University of Bayreuth. After finishing his dissertation he began his career at the Clinic of Radiology and Neuroradiology and at the Clinic of Neurology and Clinical Neurophysiology at the hospital of Augsburg. 2001 he was named functional attending chief resident and 2003 attending deputy and head of the department of vascular and interventional radiology. Since 2002 Wohlgemuth worked as a scientific assistant at the Institute for Medical Management and Health Sciences at the University of Bayreuth. 2005 he was habilitated at the faculty for law and economics in Bayreuth and received a venia legendi for medical management and health management. From 2007 to 2011 he was avocational CEO of the GWS Gesundheit Wissenschaft Strategie GmbH, a research and consulting company in the field of health management. 2009 Wohlgemuth launched the Interdisciplinary Center for Congenital Vascular Anomalies at the hospital of Augsburg, which he presided until 2011. 2011 he was appointed professor of interventional radiology and attending deputy at the Department of Radiology at the University Medical Center Regensburg. From 2012 to 2017 Wohlgemuth was head of the newly established Interdisciplinary Vascular Anomalies Center in Regensburg. In 2015 Wohlgemuth founded the first German Center for pediatric interventional radiology, an interdisciplinary treatment unit with minimal-invasive operation methods for children. In June 2017 he was appointed Ordinarius and Director of the University Clinic and Policlinic of Radiology at the Martin-Luther-Universität Halle-Wittenberg. Since 2018 he is Head of the Interdisciplinary Center of Vascular Anomalies at Universitätsklinikum Halle (Saale).

Scientific contribution 
Wohlgemuth began his scientific career in the field of neurology with the first description of a rare symptom concerning ischaemia of the lumbosacral plexus. He then worked in magnetic resonance imaging sequence research. Besides parallel publications in health economics he focused on psychometric measurement of health related quality of life, among others on the development of new psychometric instruments. He set a further focus on the scientific research in the area of interventional radiology. Here he worked on the evaluation of a new procedure for restenosis-prophylaxis after percutaneous transluminal angioplasty by means of endovascular brachytherapy, the development of a new method for portal vein-embolectomy as well as the assessment of new liquid agents for embolisation. His actual emphasis covers the development of interventional procedures for children, aortic stent grafts and the diagnostics and therapy of congenital vascular anomalies. Where he as the first person described a new method to treat arteriovenous malformations.

Academic memberships 
Wohlgemuth was the official deputy of Eckhard Nagel in the commission for sustainability in the financing of the social security systems (Kommission für die Nachhaltigkeit in der Finanzierung der sozialen Sicherungssysteme), which was established by the German government in 2002/03 under the name of  Rürup-Kommission. From 2005 to 2017 he was a member of the expert committee medical and health sciences at AQUIN, a leading German institute for accreditation, certification and quality management in the area of certification of higher education. He is also a member of the scientific advisory board of the support group for congenital vascular diseases as well as the deputy speaker of the committee for vascular diseases in childhood of the German Association for Angiology (Deutsche Gesellschaft für Angiologie). Currently Wohlgemuth is an employee of the review board of the journals European Radiology, Health Policy und Cardio Vascular and Interventional Radiology. Since 2017 he is President of the German Interdisciplinary Society of Vascular Anomalies (GISVA) and editor and author of the Compendium Vascular Anomalies, a free web-based portal with scientific expert knowledge regarding diagnosis and therapy of vascular anomalies.

Publications 

Books

 Zorger Niels, Müller-Wille René, Wohlgemuth Walter A.: Embolisationstherapie – Grundlagen und praktische Anwendung. Unimed-Verlag, Bremen, London, Boston, 2013. 
 Wohlgemuth Walter A., Freitag Michael H. Priorisierung in der Medizin – Interdisziplinäre Forschungsansätze. Medizinisch Wissenschaftliche Verlagsgesellschaft MWV, Berlin, 2009. 
 Wohlgemuth Walter A.: Evidenzbasierte Einflussfaktoren und gesundheitsbezogene Lebensqualität. Eine gesundheitswissenschaftliche Analyse anhand der peripheren arteriellen Verschlusskrankheit. Bayreuther Schriftenreihe Gesundheitsökonomie, Universität Bayreuth, Bayreuth, 2005. 
 Wohlgemuth Walter A., Mayer Julika, Nagel Eckhard: Handbuch zu einer strategischen Gesundheitsstrukturreform in Deutschland. Bayreuther Gesundheitsökonomie Bd.4, Verlag PCO, Bayreuth, 2003.

Book-articles

 Walter A. Wohlgemuth, René Müller-Wille: Direkte Lymphographie mit Intranodaler Lymphangiographie und Lymphgefäßinterventionen. In: Wolfgang Brauer (Hrsg.): Bildgebung Lymphologie. Sonographie, Lymphangiographie, MR und Nuklearmedizin. Springer Verlag, Berlin, 2021, S.167-174
 René Müller-Wille, Walter A. Wohlgemuth: Zystische Lymphatische Malformation (LM) – Diagnose und Therapie. In: Wolfgang Brauer (Hrsg.): Bildgebung Lymphologie. Sonographie, Lymphangiographie, MR und Nuklearmedizin. Springer Verlag, Berlin, 2021, S.175-184
 Wohlgemuth Walter A.: Vaskuläre Malformationen im Knochen. In: Bohndorf Klaus, Imhof Herwig, Wörtler Klaus (Hrsg.): Radiologische Diagnostik der Knochen und Gelenke. Georg Thieme Verlag, Stuttgart, New York, 2013, S.320-324.
 Volk J., Wohlgemuth Walter A.: Integrierte Versorgung. In: Nagel Eckhard (Hrsg.): Das Gesundheitswesen in Deutschland. Deutscher Ärzteverlag, Köln, 2012. S.279-287.
 Osborne Anne G., Blaser Susan I., Salzman Karen L.: Pocket Radiologist Gehirn: Die Top 100 Diagnosen. Elsevier Company, München, 2004 [Translation to German]. 
 Wohlgemuth Walter A.: Intensivmedizinisch relevante Bildgebung des Thorax. In: Eckart Joachim, Forst Helmut, Burchardi Hans: Intensivmedizin. EcoMed Verlag, Landsberg/Lech, 2003. S.7-35.
 Bohndorf Klaus, Wohlgemuth Walter A.: Radiologische Diagnostik. In: Zimmermann Walter, Amarotico Erich, Koch Hans H.: Kompaktwissen Innere Medizin. Dustri-Verlag, München, 1999. S.1-34.
 Engelhardt Michael, Willy Christian, Wohlgemuth Walter A., Wölfle Klaus-Dieter: Wie empfindet der Patient die „Vorteile“ der peripheren Bypass-Chirurgie? In: Luther Bernd, Hepp Wolfgang (Hrsg.): Kruropedale Arterienverschlüsse – Diagnostiken und Behandlungsverfahren. Steinkopff Verlag, Heidelberg, 2009. S.173-180.
 Freitag Michael H., Wohlgemuth Walter A., Nagel Eckhard: Perspektiven der Versorgungsforschung aus wissenschaftstheoretischer Sicht. In: Blettner Maria, Fuchs Christoph, Michaelis Jörg, Nagel Eckhard (Hrsg.): Versorgungsforschung als Instrument zur Gesundheitssystementwicklung. Akademie der Wissenschaften und der Literatur, Medizinische Forschung (Band 15), Mainz, 2009. S.55-60.

References 

German radiologists
1966 births
Living people